Wang Xiaoyu (1914–1995) was a People's Republic of China politician. He was born in Yidu County, Shandong Province (currently Qingzhou, Weifang, Shandong Province). He was Chinese Communist Party Committee Secretary and governor of his home province.

References 

1914 births
1995 deaths
People's Republic of China politicians from Shandong
Chinese Communist Party politicians from Shandong
Governors of Shandong
Political office-holders in Shandong
Expelled members of the Chinese Communist Party